Graveyard Disturbance is a 1987 television film directed by Lamberto Bava.

Plot
Five teen friends after stealing from a store end up in a gothic cemetery. While there they enter a tavern where the bartender challenges them to stay the night in a cursed crypt and if they survive the night, they get a treasure.

Production
Following the success of the film Demons and Demons 2 and other foreign horror films in Italy, the company Reiteitalia would announce in July 1986 that a series titled Brivido giallo which would be made featuring five made-for-television film directed by Lamberto Bava. Of these films only four would be made: Graveyard Disturbance, Until Death, The Ogre and Dinner with a Vampire.

Graveyard Disturbance was originally developed under the title Dentro il cimitero. Bava described the film as being not as heavy as his Demons films and would have more "relaxed" and "tongue-in-cheek" approach.
The film is set in the countryside around Bolsena.

Releases
Graveyard Disturbance was first shown at the Sitges Film Festival in Spain in October 1987. Lamberto Bava introduced the film himself, telling the audience that it was not intended for theatrical release. The film received a chorus of boos from the audience. It was later aired on Italia 1 on August 8, 1989.

Reception
Kim Newman wrote in his book Nightmare Movies that Graveyard Disturbance was an uninspired spoof and Bava's worst film to date.

References

Footnotes

Sources

External links

1987 television films
1987 films
1987 horror films
Italian television films
Films directed by Lamberto Bava
1980s supernatural horror films
Italian horror films
Films scored by Simon Boswell
Horror television films
1980s Italian films